The southern African anchovy (Engraulis capensis) is a species of anchovy which occurs in the southeast Atlantic Ocean near Namibia and South Africa.

References

Southern African anchovy
Southern African anchovy
Marine fauna of Southern Africa
Fish of Namibia
Marine fish of South Africa
Southern African anchovy
Taxa named by John Dow Fisher Gilchrist